Glazovo is a rural locality (a selo) and the administrative center of Norovo-Rotayevskoye Rural Settlement, Nizhnedevitsky District, Voronezh Oblast, Russia. The population was 782 as of 2010. There are 8 streets.

Geography 
Glazovo is located 12 km southeast of Nizhnedevitsk (the district's administrative centre) by road. Mikhnyovo is the nearest rural locality.

References 

Rural localities in Nizhnedevitsky District